The revolt of the Cruel Fat Thursday was a revolt that broke out on Fat Thursday in 1511 in Friuli in Northeast Italy.

Background

The discontent in Friuli near the beginning of the 16th century
After less than a century of Venetian occupation of the Fatherland of Friuli the discontent caused by heavy privileges practiced by the clergy and nobility started spreading out among the population; to worsen the situation the noble families were in constant war between themselves, which caused an increase of taxes, devastation of territory, and a necessity to serve in the master's army.

By the 16th-century, the Venetian Republic had never granted Friuli the same status as the other mainland domains (domini di terra), but considered the territory important as a buffer against the Ottoman armies. The second class status of the region was reflected in a paucity of investments in the mainly rural region for social and economical development.

That led to an isolation of the region in cultural and linguistic terms from Venice, and the absence of any communal governance structures. This exacerbated the discontent of the peasant communities in this still mainly feudal rural area. To this situation, the local nobility, deprived of its former power by the government of Venice, tried to maintain its social status by exploiting their remaining rights and demanding services from the peasants.

The first popular uprisings
The first tumults began as early as 1509 when a crowd of armed peasants took possession of the castle in Sterpo, chased out the inhabitants, and set it on fire. That was the last act of a clash that had been dragged on for some time now between the inhabitants of Virco, Flambro, and Sivigliano against the aristocratic Colloredo family, the owners of the castle, accused of usurping the community's pastures and woods for their own advantage.

It was the event that raised the public opinion as for various years all the region was shaken by disputes and skirmishes stirred up by the peasants against the nobility, their families, soldiers, servants, or their representatives (clashes occurred with Spilimbergo, Maniago, Valvasone, Portogruaro, Colloredo, Tarcento).

In 1510, a group of Friulan noblemen was returning from Venice where they had asked greater protection against the disorders. They were intercepted and chased away by a group of armed peasants at the height of Zompicchia (the ambush of Malazumpicchia).

Coalitions on the eve of Fat Thursday 1511
The Savorgnan, an aristocratic family of Udine, who had been declared pro-Venetian, took advantage of the disorders for personal gain.

Their politics was based on a patronage system that tied them directly to the population. They granted rights within their jurisdictions to the peasants or conferred old customs of lands exploitation as such. In case of crop failure, they opened their stores to the starving population, provided loans, listened to the neighborhood vicinie representatives' opinion.

This protection system intentionally created a real clan, whose members became known as zamberlani, who were identified with the charismatic figure of Antonio Savorgnan, so close the Venetian rulers as to be nominated general commander of the cernide, the armed peasants' militias (called up in case of war).

This faction was opposed by the strumieri, who took possession of a great part of the old Friulian nobility that could not tolerate the Serenissima members' attempts to hold on to their powers; at the head of them were the members of the Della Torre family, sworn enemies of the Savorgnan family since 1339. The strumieri gained the support of the anti-Venetian Habsburg monarchy.

Outbreak of Fat Thursday revolt

On 27 February 1511, Fat Thursday, Antonio Savorgnan allegedly staged an Imperial attack against Udine, using the Cividalian soldiers led by his nephew Alvise da Porto, and calling on the people to defend the city. In the midst of the chaos caused by the failing attack, Savorgnan instigated the plunder of the Della Torre properties. Followed by a wave of lust for looting, a plunder of almost all Udinese nobility's palaces (except for the Savorgnan palace, the real headquarters of the revolt).

Many members of the Della Torre, Colloredo, della Frattina, Soldonieri, Gorgo, Bertolini families and others were murdered, their bodies were stripped and abandoned in the streets of the city centre, or dragged through the mud and then thrown in nearby cemeteries. Then the rebels put on the nobles' clothes, staging a macabre masquerade and imitating the ways of the original owners, actually embodying the spirit of "inversion of roles" typical of a carnival. The noblemen who escaped retreated to their castles, or way beyond the Tagliamento river, in the western Friuli.

At that point, Antonio Savorgnan's plan concluded, and while he remained officially unlinked to the riots, it had succeeded in eliminating many of his rival family leaders. To avoid a betrayal he murdered two of his armed men who knew of his involvement in the massacre and dumped the bodies, together with that of a third witness, in the St John's well.

Revolt suppressed
Only a few days later an armed contingent from Gradisca arrived and managed to restore the public order, but it didn't stop the carnival procession focused on mocking the murdered nobility.
Meanwhile, the trail of violence spread over the territories bordering Udine and gradually all over the region. The villages' inhabitants, most of them peasants, armed as if for a war, besieged the castles inhabited by the nobility: Those of Spilimbergo, Valvasone, Cusano, and Salvarolo and Zoppola were taken by force.

The strumieri's troops reorganized close to the castle of Giulio di Porcia, gaining the support of the men of the Venetian ruler of Pordenone, of some Sacilians and of about 800 inhabitants of the Concordia Sagittaria zone.

The decisive clash took place close to the river Cellina, were the cavalry (circa 70 horsemen) and the best trained strumieri defeated their enemies. As a warning, Giulio hanged one of the rebels' leaders close to the Castle of Zoppola, forcing the prisoners to help with the scene.

On 26 March of the same year, a violent earthquake devastated Udine and the entire region, causing ten thousand casualties. Later on the same territories were scourged by the plague: these tragic events were interpreted by contemporaries as a tangible sign of divine justice.

Aftermath

The Venetian government established a special tribunal that condemned to death the main exponents of the revolt, but failed to adjudicate the real culprit, Antonio Savorgnan who, given the overall negative outcome, paradoxically found shelter among the Imperial's ranks which he had so long opposed to, in Villach, in the Austrian territory. 

Yet the revenge was not late to come since a strumieri conspiracy organized his assassination that happened on 27 May 1512 at the exit from the Villach's St Jacob church on the part of Spilimbergo's and Colloredo's noblemen's hand. 

Upon a shoot-out orchestrated by Tristano Savorgnan right in the centre of Venice, in which Alvise della Torre Jr. (the youngest son of the leader of the strumieri faction murdered during the "Fat Thursday massacre") and some members of the Colloredo family were killed, the governor of Venice confiscated the Savorgnan family's assets in 1549 and destroyed their family palace in Udine, leaving its ruins as a warning in what was called place de ruine ("square of the ruins" in Friulian language, or "piazza delle rovine" in Italian; now "Venerio Square", after the Udinese metereologist Gerolamo Venerio). 

Yet Antonio Savorgnan's death kicked off both the revenge and the retaliation triggered by the Fat Thursday's events that erased by now the revolt's collective dimension and acquired a feud's and settlement of personal accounts' character. The last duel connected to these events happened in 1568 between Troiano d'Arcano, and Tristano Savorgnan, in which both died.

The great mass of peasants who had participated in the revolt returned to their work in the fields in the same conditions as before, but the governor of Serenissima decided to prevent possible new revolts by making some efforts towards the zamberlans' requests and therefore setting a peasantry organization, the "contadinanza", composed of peasants' representatives who could veto on the Parliament's proposals.

Notes

Bibliography

 (Reader's edition: Mad Blood Stirring. Vendetta in Renaissance Italy, The Johns Hopkins University Press, 1993, 1998) 
  Diarii Udinesi dall'anno 1508 al 1541, Gregorio Amaseo

Rebellions against the Republic of Venice
1511 in Italy
Conflicts in 1511
1511 in the Republic of Venice
16th-century rebellions
History of Friuli-Venezia Giulia